Tuvia Beeri (August 29, 1929 Czechoslovakia – May 2022) was a Czech-Israeli painter.

Beeri immigrated to Israel in 1948. He studied in 1957 at the Oranim Art Institute in Qiryat Tivon, with Marcel Janco and Yaakov Wexler and from 1961 to 1963 with Johnny Friedlaender at the École des Beaux-Arts in Paris. In 1963 he returned to Israel to teach at the Bezalel Academy of Art and Design in Jerusalem and from 1964 was also etching at the Avni Institute in Tel Aviv.

In 2001 he won the Eli Oshorov Prize for contribution to Israeli Art from the Israeli Painters and Sculptors Association (IPSA).

Selected collections 
 Israel Museum, Jerusalem
 Tel Aviv Museum of Art

References

External links 
 Tuvia Beeri at the Israeli Art Centre (Israel Museum, Jerusalem
 Tuvia Beeri  at Artnet.com

1929 births
2022 deaths
Czech painters
Czech male painters
Israeli male painters
Jewish painters
Israeli people of Czech-Jewish descent
Czechoslovak emigrants to Israel
20th-century Israeli male artists
21st-century Israeli male artists